Carrigadrohid is a townland and village in the parish of Aghinagh, County Cork, Ireland. It is situated on the north bank of the River Lee, with the nearby village of Canovee to the south. Carrigadrohid is part of the Dáil constituency of Cork North-West.

Castle

Carrigadrohid castle stands on a rock in the middle of the river Lee, adjacent to the bridge which gives the village its name. It was erected in the 15th century by the MacCarthys of Muskerry, with an extension to the east and an annex to the north being added in subsequent centuries.
It was besieged by Parliamentary forces following the Battle of Macroom, and Boetius MacEgan, the Bishop of Ross, was hanged by the reins of his own horse outside the castle having refused to implore the Irish garrison to surrender to the Cromwellian army.

The MacCarthys were dispossessed, and the castle ended up in the hands of the Bowen family. It has been in ruins since the late 18th century.
In later years, a local group has been formed with the aim of preserving the castle.

Sport
Carrigadrohid is the home of Canovee GAA Club (Irish: Cumann Luthchleas Gael Cheann an Mhaighe), an intermediate Gaelic football club with a catchment area centred on Carrigadrohid and extending south and east to Aherla, Farnanes and Cloughduv. Canovee GAA has a large playing field and two smaller training pitches on the club's main campus - with playing fields at Lehane's inch, on the banks of the Lee, near the hydroelectric power station.

See also
List of towns and villages in Ireland

References

Towns and villages in County Cork
MacCarthy dynasty